The  Wichita Wild season was the team's fourth season as a football franchise and second in the Indoor Football League (IFL). One of twenty-five teams competing in the IFL for the 2010 season, the Storm were members of the Great Plains Division of the United Conference. The team played their home games at the Sioux Falls Arena in Sioux Falls, South Dakota.

Schedule

Regular season

Standings

Playoffs

Roster

References

Wichita Wild
Wichita Wild
Wichita Wild